The Coleraine Formation is a geologic formation in Minnesota. It preserves fossils dating back to the Cretaceous period.

See also

 List of fossiliferous stratigraphic units in Minnesota
 Paleontology in Minnesota
 Hill-Annex Mine State Park

External links
 Hill-Annex Mine State Park
 Hill Annex Mine Paleontology Project
 Hill Annex Mine Fossil Gallery

References
 

Cretaceous Minnesota